Ronghua railway station is a railway station located in Zhudong, Hsinchu County, Taiwan. It is located on the Neiwan line and is operated by the Taiwan Railways Administration.

Tickets sold between Ronghua and Fugui railway station are considered auspicious because the stations names form the phrase "wealth and honor".

References

2001 establishments in Taiwan
Railway stations opened in 2001
Railway stations in Hsinchu County
Railway stations served by Taiwan Railways Administration